The Thailand national women's cricket team is the team that represents the country of Thailand in international women's cricket matches. Thailand is one of the strongest associate teams in women's international cricket and has been ranked as high as tenth in the ICC Women's T20I rankings.

A member of the International Cricket Council (ICC) since 1995, Thailand's women team made their international debut when they played, and lost, two matches against Bangladesh in July 2007. The team hosted and won the 2013 ACC Women's Championship to qualify for its first ICC global tournament, the 2013 World Twenty20 Qualifier. Thailand was runner-up at the 2019 edition of the tournament and qualified for the 2020 ICC Women's T20 World Cup in Australia, the first appearance by Thailand in any cricket world championship. The team was awarded women's One Day International (ODI) status in 2022 and received their first ODI Ranking in November of 2022.

History
The team's first international tournament outside of Asian Cricket Council regional events was the 2013 World Twenty20 Qualifier, in which they placed fifth out of eight teams. The team was less successful at the 2015 edition of the tournament, which it hosted, winning only one match (against the Netherlands) to finish seventh.

In May 2016, Sri Lankan fast bowler Janak Gamage was named as a head coach of the team. In February 2017, Thailand played their first 50-over match, when they faced India in the 2017 Women's Cricket World Cup Qualifier in Sri Lanka. India won the match by 9 wickets. In August 2017, Thailand won the gold medal in the women's tournament at the 2017 Southeast Asian Games, going undefeated from four matches.

In April 2018, the International Cricket Council (ICC) granted full Women's Twenty20 International (WT20I) status to all its members. Therefore, all Twenty20 matches played between Thailand women and another international side since 1 July 2018 have been full WT20Is.

On 9 June 2018, during the 2018 Women's Twenty20 Asia Cup, Thailand beat Sri Lanka by four wickets to register their first ever win against a Full Member side. In February 2019, they won the 2019 ICC Women's Qualifier Asia, therefore progressing to both the 2019 ICC Women's World Twenty20 Qualifier and the 2021 Women's Cricket World Cup Qualifier tournaments. In August 2019, during the 2019 Netherlands Women's Quadrangular Series, they won their 17th win in a row, breaking the previous record of 16 consecutive wins in WT20I cricket set by Australia. Thailand qualified to 2020 T20 World Cup in Australia after finished in top two in 2019 ICC Women's World Twenty20 Qualifier.

On 3 March 2020 at the Sydney Showground Stadium, Thailand scored 150 runs for three wickets against Pakistan, the highest total for the team in Women's T20 World Cup and at that ground, before the match was abandoned due to rain. Natthakan Chantam scored 56 to register Thailand's first Women's T20 World Cup half-century; she and Nattaya Boochatham, who scored 44, combined for an opening partnership of 93. Ironically, this would be Thailand's highest WT20 score until the following year, and still remains Thailand's only no-result as of 2022.

In 2021, the Thai team embarked on a 15-match tour of Zimbabwe and South Africa to prepare for the Women's Cricket World Cup Qualifier, held November 2021 in Harare, Zimbabwe. At the qualifier, the team was leading Group B with three wins from four matches, when the tournament was called off, due to concerns about a new COVID variant and travel restrictions. As a consequence, the three remaining places in the World Cup were handed to Bangladesh, Pakistan and the West Indies on the basis of their Women's One Day International rankings, and Thailand, which had beaten Bangladesh but did not have such a ranking, missed out, not only on the World Cup, but also on the next round of the ICC Women's Championship; at the point the qualifiers were abandoned, Thailand would have had at least two points carried forward to the unplayed Super Six round from the aforementioned win over Bangladesh, and would only have needed to not finish last in that round to qualify for the latter. According to women's cricket historian Raf Nicholson, of Bournemouth University in England, that outcome set back women's cricket in Thailand by three years. As the use of ODI rankings meant that Thailand (and other associate member nations) would never have been able to qualify for either event, regardless of their results, in light of the cancellation, this decision has been criticized as "utterly disgraceful (and) utterly farcical".

As a result of the controversial circumstances of Thailand's failure to qualify for either event, Cricket Association of Thailand president Ravi Sehgal was reported in April 2022 as saying "We should have been given a fair chance to qualify", and it was also reported that he had petitioned the ICC and board directors in December with an impassioned plea for Thailand to be granted ODI status. In May 2022, the ICC announced Thailand as one of five women's sides to gain Women's One Day International (ODI) status.  Netherlands, Papua New Guinea, Scotland and the United States are the other four teams.

In October 2022, Thailand qualified for the semifinals of the 2022 Women's Twenty20 Asia Cup, aided by their first-ever win over Pakistan, in their first encounter since the abandoned match in Sydney. In November, it was announced that the Netherlands would play 8 matches against the Thai team in Chiang Mai that month, 4 each of ODIs (Thailand's first since earning status) and WT20Is.  Thailand won all four of the ODIs, and three of the four WT20Is, with the Netherlands earning their first-ever win over Thailand in the 2nd WT20I.

In February 2023, it was reported that the Thai women's team were set for their first tour of Ireland, to play three 50-over ODI matches and two T20I's in June.

Tournament history

ICC Women's T20 World Cup

ICC Women's T20 World Cup Qualifier
 2015: 7th (DNQ)
 2018: 5th (DNQ)
 2019: 2nd (Q)
 2022: 4th (DNQ)

Women's Asia Cup (T20I format)

Asian Games (T20I format)

Southeast Asian Games (T20I format)

Records and statistics
International Match Summary — Thailand Women
 
Last updated 3 December 2022

One-Day International

ODI record versus other nations

Records complete to WODI #1302. Last updated 26 November 2022.

Twenty20 International

 Highest team total: 154/3 v Zimbabwe on 28 August 2021 at Takashinga Cricket Club, Harare.
 Highest individual score: 88*, Natthakan Chantam v Zimbabwe, 28 August 2021 at Takashinga Cricket Club, Harare.
 Best individual bowling figures: 5/4, Chanida Sutthiruang v Indonesia, 15 January 2019 at Asian Institute of Technology Ground, Bangkok.

Most T20I runs for Thailand Women

Most T20I wickets for Thailand Women

T20I record versus other nations

Records complete to WT20I #1309. Last updated 3 December 2022.

Current squad
This lists all players who were picked in the latest One-day or T20I squad. Last updated as on 19 September 2021.

See also
 List of Thailand women Twenty20 International cricketers

References

Further reading

 
 

Thailand women's national cricket team
   
Cricket, women's
Women's national cricket teams
Women
2007 establishments in Thailand